Dream Love + Pray is the third studio album release by Canadian Christian pop and a cappella group Rhythm & News, in 1994.

Track listing

Personnel
Doug Zimmermann
Kevin Pollard 
Mark Batten
Brad Strelau

References

Rhythm & News albums
1994 albums